Pailly refers to the following places:

 Pailly, Switzerland
 Pailly, Yonne, commune in France